Kevin Hammond may refer to:

Kevin Hammond (singer-songwriter) (born 1985), American musician
Kevin Kato Hammond (born 1965), American musician, author, and journalist